Mieczysław Srokowski (14 August 1873 in the village of Bybło, Podole – 11 September 1910 in Warsaw) was a Polish writer and poet. His 1910 novel, Kult ciała, Dziennik człowieka samotnego was adapted in the film Kult ciała in 1930 and starred Victor Varconi.

Selected works
Chore sny (1899)
Epigoni (1904)
Krew (1906)
Ich Tajemnica (1908)
Kult ciała, Dziennik człowieka samotnego (1910)
Anachroniści (1910)
Jak łza 1910)
Jus primae noctis (nieukończona) (1910)

Polish male writers
Polish poets
1873 births
1910 deaths
People from Ternopil Oblast
Burials at Powązki Cemetery